You Make Me Brave: Live at the Civic marks the ninth album from Bethel Music, a worship group based out of Redding, California. The album was released through the group's imprint label, "Bethel Music", on April 21, 2014. The album was produced by Gabriel Wilson and Daniel MacKenzie, and executively produced by Brian Johnson and Joel Taylor.

Background
You Make Me Brave was recorded live at Redding's Civic Auditorium during Bethel Church's women's conference in the summer of 2013.

Critical reception
The album was reviewed by Josh White of The Church Collective saying that it is "classic Bethel", with three of the 12 tracks recorded during spontaneous moments of worship. White continues on to say that "the worship leaders from Bethel seriously outdo themselves with their musical influence, heavy synth, and wisely put-together arrangements of songs." When talking about the songs, he said "One of the songs that stuck out to me the most was Brian Johnson and Kari Jobe's "Forever." The arrangement feel and sounds like rendition of both Brian and Kari's version of the song. I was never a big fan of this song – until I heard this version. It takes every emotional influence the song has to offer, and takes it up a few notches. The title song, "You Make Me Brave," sounds and feels very, very personal. Jen said herself, "What was celebrated was what God was doing, not who was doing what. I really hope that people feel that the highlight is what the Lord is saying through the whole album versus who sang what, who did what, whose name is on what." He finally said, "All in all, this is what worship leaders want – solid, biblical, fresh songs that can speak to their people and have an amazing sound."

Singles
A studio version of "You Make Me Brave" was released as the first single on June 17, 2014. Vocals were provided by Amanda Cook.

A radio version of "It Is Well" was released as the second single from the album on March 31, 2015. Vocals were provided by Kristene DiMarco.

Accolades
This album was No. 8 on the Worship Leader'''s Top 20 Albums of 2014 list.

The song, "It Is Well", was No. 13 on the Worship Leader'''s Top 20 Songs of 2014 list.

Track listing

Credits
Adapted from AllMusic.

 Heather Armstrong — photography
 Clint Aull — technician
 Amanda Cook — vocals, worship leader
 Kristene DiMarco — vocals, worship leader
 Steffany Frizzell-Gretzinger — vocals, worship leader
 Chris Greely — engineer, mixing engineer
 Myriah Grubbs — background vocals
 Nathan Grubbs — stage design
 Tyler Hanns — cover design
 Kalley Heiligenthal — background vocals
 Luke Hendrickson — engineer
 Kiley Hill — project manager
 Kari Jobe — vocals, worship leader
 Brian Johnson — acoustic guitar, executive producer
 Jenn Johnson — vocals, worship leader
 Judah Kirkwood — assistant technician, guitar technician
 Aaron Knott — assistant engineer
 Jeremy Larson — strings arrangement, strings
 Daniel Mackenzie — bass, engineer, producer
 Casey Marvin — backline technician, guitar technician
 Graham Moore — percussion
 Michael Pope — electric guitar
 Kallan Sadler — keyboard
 David Whitworth — drums
 Michael Spear — back cover photo, cover photo
 Bobby Strand — electric guitar, pre-production
 Joel Taylor — executive producer
 Paul Vaffa-Coffman — monitor technician
 Leah Valenzuela — vocals, worship leader
 Hank Williams — mastering
 Gabriel Wilson — engineer, producer

Charts

Album

Weekly charts

Year-end charts

Singles

Certifications and sales

References

2014 live albums
Bethel Music albums